Redhead from Manhattan is a 1943 comedy film directed by Lew Landers and written by Joseph Hoffman. The film stars Lupe Vélez in one of her last screen appearances, Michael Duane, Tim Ryan, Gerald Mohr, Lillian Yarbo and Arthur Loft. The film was released on May 6, 1943, by Columbia Pictures.

Plot
Lupe Vélez plays a dual role, twin sisters Rita and Elaine. After escaping a torpedoed ship, Rita shows up in Manhattan, where she takes the place of her Broadway-star twin sister Elaine, who's having problems with her marriage and needs to make a getaway. Neither Elaine's husband or Rita's saxophone-player boyfriend are aware of the switch.

Cast
Lupe Vélez as Rita Manners/Elaine Manners
Michael Duane as Jimmy Randall
Tim Ryan as Mike Glendon
Gerald Mohr as Chick Andrews
Lillian Yarbo as Polly
Arthur Loft as Sig Hammersmith
Lewis Wilson as Paul
Douglas Leavitt as Joe
Clancy Cooper as Policeman
Johnny Mitchell as Marty Britt
Lillian Yarbo as Polly

References

External links

1943 films
American black-and-white films
Columbia Pictures films
Films directed by Lew Landers
1943 comedy films
American comedy films
1940s American films